Paddy Burke (born 15 January 1955) is an Irish Fine Gael politician who has served as a Senator for the Agricultural Panel since 1993. He previously served as Cathaoirleach of Seanad Éireann from 2011 to 2016 and Leas-Chathaoirleach of Seanad Éireann from 2002 to 2011.

Burke was a member of Mayo County Council from 1979 until the abolition of the dual mandate in 2003. He was first elected to the Oireachtas in the 1993 election to the 20th Seanad as a Senator for the Agricultural Panel, which also returned him to the 21st Seanad in 1997 and to the 22nd Seanad in 2002. In September 2002, Burke was elected as Leas-Chathaoirleach (Deputy Chairman) of the Seanad, and after his re-election in 2007 to the 23rd Seanad he was re-elected as Leas Cathaoirleach.

He was elected as the Cathaoirleach of the 24th Seanad on 25 May 2011.

Following his involvement in the Oireachtas Golf Society Scandal ("Golfgate") in August 2020, Burke was one of six senators who lost the party whip in the Senate as punishment for their actions. The party unanimously.voted to restore the whip to Burke in January 2021.

References

External links
Paddy Burke's page on the Fine Gael website

1955 births
Living people
Cathaoirligh of Seanad Éireann
Fine Gael senators
Local councillors in County Mayo
Members of the 20th Seanad
Members of the 21st Seanad
Members of the 22nd Seanad
Members of the 23rd Seanad
Members of the 24th Seanad
Members of the 25th Seanad
Members of the 26th Seanad